Dorycera limpidipennis is a species of ulidiid or picture-winged fly in the genus Dorycera of the family Ulidiidae.

References

limpidipennis